The 2000 AFC Asian Cup was the 12th edition of the men's AFC Asian Cup, a quadrennial international football tournament organised by the Asian Football Confederation (AFC). The finals were held in Lebanon between 12 and 29 October 2000. Japan defeated defending champion Saudi Arabia in the final match in Beirut.

Qualification

42 teams participated in a preliminary tournament. It was divided into 10 groups and the first-placed team of each group thus qualified. A total of 84 games were held, starting with the Oman versus Kyrgyzstan game on 3 August 1999.

The 12 qualifying teams were:

Notes:
1 Bold indicates champion for that year
2 Italic indicates host

Stadiums

Squads

Tournament summary
Lebanon participated in the country's first ever football competition in the history as host, but began disappointingly, losing 0–4 to mighty Iran. Lebanon sought to reinvigorate the team against Iraq and Thailand, but all ended up in just draws, and Lebanon finished bottom in the group, the first host nation since Qatar 1988 to not progress from the group stage. Iran and Iraq managed to survive in the group A with seven and four points respectively, and Thailand took the third, but did not progress due to inferior points, having won no match in their group. Group B saw South Korea failed to achieve a top two finish, falling behind group winner China and Kuwait, but qualified as the best third place team, with the team's only win was against Indonesia. Indonesia was the only team to not score a single goal in the tournament, being beaten by South Korea and China, and a goalless draw with Kuwait. Group C witnessed Uzbekistan to become the worst-performed team in the tournament, being heavily beaten 1–8 by Japan and 0–5 by defending champions Saudi Arabia. The Japanese scrambled to top the group with a famous 4–1 win over the Saudis, though Saudi Arabia would go on to progress together after an unpromising group stage performance. Qatar, another participant in the group, finished in third and progressed thanked for one point ahead of Thailand, having drawn in all three matches.

The quarter-finals saw Iran lost 1–2 to South Korea by a golden goal of Lee Dong-gook, and the same happened in Saudi Arabia's victory over Kuwait, also by a golden goal of Nawaf Al-Temyat. China and Japan easily passed through their Arab rivals Qatar and Iraq, with 3–1 and 4–1 wins respectively, to set up an entirely East Asian affair in the semi-finals, with Saudi Arabia being the only non-East Asian team to be here.

The first semi-finals saw Saudi Arabia sealed the victory over the South Koreans, with two goals by Talal Al-Meshal at 76' and 80' meant Lee Dong-gook's late equalizer was too little, too late. Japan beat China in a thriller in Beirut, 3–2, to once again face the Saudis in the final. In the third place match, South Korea won bronze with a 1–0 win over China.

The final in Beirut was filled with majority of Saudi supporters, and was seen as the rematch of the 1992 final and earlier group stage encounter. Hamzah Idris had a chance to take the Saudis ahead of Japan at 10', but he missed the opportunity. Eventually, the missing penalty was what the Saudis regretted the most, because Shigeyoshi Mochizuki, who had accidentally given the Saudis the failed opportunity on the penalty earlier, became the hero of Japan with a goal in 30'. Saudi attempt proved to be fruitless, and Japan won the game by just one goal margin, to conquer its second Asian trophy, repeating Japan's victory over Saudi Arabia eight years ago. Subsequently, Japan, the winner, automatically qualified for the 2004 AFC Asian Cup.

First round
All times are Lebanon summer time (UTC+3).

Group A

Group B

Group C

Third-placed qualifiers
At the end of the first stage, a comparison was made between the third placed teams of each group. The two best third-placed teams advanced to the quarter-finals.

South Korea and Qatar, the two best third-placed teams, qualified for the quarter-finals.

Knockout stage 
All times are Lebanon summer time (UTC+3)

Extra times were played under the golden goal rule.

Quarter-finals

Semi-finals

Third place play-off

Final

Statistics

Goalscorers

With six goals, Lee Dong-Gook is the top scorer in the tournament. In total, 77 goals were scored by 43 different players, with two of them credited as own goals.

6 goals 
  Lee Dong-gook

5 goals 

  Akinori Nishizawa
  Naohiro Takahara

3 goals 

  Qi Hong
  Yang Chen
  Ali Daei
  Hiroshi Nanami
  Talal Al-Meshal
  Mohammad Al-Shalhoub
  Nawaf Al-Temyat

 2 goals 

  Li Ming
  Karim Bagheri
  Hamid Estili
  Sabah Jeayer
  Tomokazu Myojin
  Jasem Al-Huwaidi
  Sakesan Pituratana

 1 goal 

  Fan Zhiyi
  Shen Si
  Su Maozhen
  Qahtan Chathir
  Abbas Obeid
  Haidar Mahmoud
  Hideaki Kitajima
  Shigeyoshi Mochizuki
  Hiroaki Morishima
  Shinji Ono
  Atsushi Yanagisawa
  Kim Sang-sik
  Lee Young-pyo
  Noh Jung-yoon
  Bashar Abdullah
  Abbas Chahrour
  Luís Fernandes
  Moussa Hojeij
  Mohammed Salem Al-Enazi
  Abdulnasser Al-Obaidly
  Mohammed Gholam
  Marzouk Al-Otaibi
  Sergey Lushan
  Mirjalol Qosimov

Own goal
  Fan Zhiyi (for Japan)
  Ryuzo Morioka (for Saudi Arabia)

Awards
Most Valuable Player
  Hiroshi Nanami

Top scorer
  Lee Dong-gook

Best Defender
  Ryuzo Morioka

Best Goalkeeper
  Jiang Jin

Fair Play Award
 

Team of the Tournament

Final standings

References

External links
 RSSSF Details
 

 
AFC Asian Cup tournaments
Asian Cup
AFC Asian Cup
International association football competitions hosted by Lebanon
October 2000 sports events in Asia